Audley may refer to:

People
Audley (surname)
Audley Harrison, British boxer

Places
Audley End House, a country house just outside Saffron Walden, Essex, England
Audley House, London, a block of flats in central London, England
Audley, Ontario, a former unincorporated community in Canada, now part of town of Ajax
Audley, Staffordshire, a village in England
Audley, New South Wales, a suburb of Sydney, Australia

Other uses
Baron Audley, a title in the Peerage of England
Audley Travel, a tour operator with offices in the UK, USA and Canada.
Audley Group, a market leader in the UK in building and managing luxury retirement villages